New York City's 50th City Council district is one of 51 districts in the New York City Council. It has been represented by Republican David Carr since the end of 2021. Carr was the chief of staff to former Councilman Steven Matteo. Matteo was term-limited in 2021 and ran unsuccessfully for Staten Island Borough President.

Geography
District 50 covers a large swath of Mid-Island Staten Island, including the neighborhoods of New Dorp, Midland Beach, Dongan Hills, South Beach, Arrochar, Bloomfield, Bulls Head, Castleton Corners, Chelsea, Egbertville, Emerson Hill, Grant City, Grasmere, Lighthouse Hill, Manor Heights, Meiers Corners, Oakwood, Old Town, Richmondtown, Shore Acres, Todt Hill, Travis, Westerleigh, Willowbrook, and parts of Concord, Graniteville, Heartland Village, New Springville, and Rosebank.

Between 2001 and 2010, the district covered Mid-Island, in addition to a portion of Dyker Heights and Bath Beach in Brooklyn. The Brooklyn portion was reallocated to the 43rd district following redistricting in 2013.

Most of the district's population lives in its eastern half; to the west lies Freshkills Park, the Staten Island Greenbelt, and the remnants of Fresh Kills Landfill. Fort Wadsworth and Miller Field are also located within the district.

The district overlaps with Staten Island Community Boards 1, 2, and 3, and is contained entirely within New York's 11th congressional district. It also overlaps with the 23rd and 24th districts of the New York State Senate, and with the 61st, 62nd, 63rd, and 64th districts of the New York State Assembly.

Recent election results

2021
In 2019, voters in New York City approved Ballot Question 1, which implemented ranked-choice voting in all local primary and special elections. Under the new system, voters have the option to rank up to five candidates for every local office. Voters whose first-choice candidates fare poorly will have their votes redistributed to other candidates in their ranking until one candidate surpasses the 50 percent threshold. If one candidate surpasses 50 percent in first-choice votes, then ranked-choice tabulations will not occur.

Results below remain unofficial, as a hand recount of the contest is underway. If the outcome holds, the 50th district will be one of only three districts in the city in which the eventual winner did not receive the highest number of first-choice votes (the other two being the 9th and 25th districts).

2017

2013

2009

Previous Councilmembers
 John Fusco (created 1992–1998)
 James Oddo (1999–2013)
 Steven Matteo (2014–2021)
 David Carr (2021–present)

References

New York City Council districts